Topolovac may refer to:

Croatia 
 Topolovac, Sisak-Moslavina County, a village near Sisak
 Zrinski Topolovac, a village in Bjelovar-Bilogora County
 Topolovec
 Topolovec, a village near Vrbovec, Zagreb County
 Topolovec Pisarovinski, a village near Pisarovina, Zagreb County

Serbia 
 Ravni Topolovac, a village in Serbia

See also
 Dunafalva, a village in Bács-Kiskun county, Hungary
 Topolovățu Mare, a village in Timiș County, Romania